Effective power may refer to:

Active power or real power, a concept in AC power
A measurement of horsepower
"effective power" (bug), a bug with the iPhone's SpringBoard app

See also
Mean effective pressure